Gary William Ramey is a Canadian politician, who was elected to the Nova Scotia House of Assembly in the 2009 provincial election. He represented the electoral district of Lunenburg West as a member of the New Democratic Party until his defeat in the 2013 election.

Ramey was the ministerial assistant for the Department of Health in the government of Darrell Dexter.

References

Year of birth missing (living people)
Living people
Nova Scotia New Democratic Party MLAs
People from Lunenburg County, Nova Scotia
21st-century Canadian politicians